Baran (born January 4, 1988, in Mahabad, Iran) is a Kurdish-Iranian singer. She is the youngest of four siblings.

Early life
At the age of 11, Baran moved to Canada with her family.  Baran earned her business degree at a Canadian college.

See also
 Music of Iran
 Pouya Jalili Pour

References

External links
 
 
 Baran on Spotify

1992 births
Living people
Iranian emigrants to Canada
21st-century Iranian women singers
Iranian women pop singers
Iranian pop singers
People from Mahabad
Iranian Kurdish women